is a Japanese businesswoman, founder and chief executive of the temporary personnel service company The R. She serves on the board of Culture Convenience Club Co., Ltd. A graduate of Konan University, she is best known for her criticism of "gap-widening society".

She also presented the 120th GRIPS Forum on the challenges for Japanese women in the workforce.

References

External links 

 Reiko's style (personal page)

1950 births
Japan Post Holdings
Japanese chief executives
Japanese anti-communists
Living people
People from Kobe
20th-century Japanese businesswomen
20th-century Japanese businesspeople
Konan University alumni
21st-century Japanese businesswomen
21st-century Japanese businesspeople